Diogenianus was a Greek grammarian from Heraclea in Pontus (or in Caria) who flourished during the reign of Hadrian. He was the author of an alphabetical lexicon, chiefly of poetical words, abridged from the great lexicon  of Pamphilus of Alexandria (AD 50) and other similar works. It was also known by the title  (“Manual for those without means”). It formed the basis of the lexicon, or rather glossary, of Hesychius of Alexandria, which is described in the preface as a new edition of the work of Diogenianus. A collection of 776 proverbs under his name is still extant bearing the name Παροιμίαι δημώδεις ἐκ τῆς Διογενιανοῦ συναγωγῆς, probably an abridgment of the collection made by himself from his lexicon (ed. by Ernst von Leutsch and Friedrich Wilhelm Schneidewin in Paroemiographi Graeci, i. 1839). Diogenianus was also the author of an "Anthology of epigrams about rivers, lakes, cliffs, mountains and mountain ridges" (Ἐπιγραμμάτων ἀνθολόγιον περὶ ποταμῶν λιμνῶν κρηνῶν ὀρῶν ἀκρωρειῶν), a list (with map) of all the towns in the world (Συναγωγὴ καὶ πίναξ τῶν ἐν πάσῃ τῇ γῇ πόλεων)., and of a list of rivers (περὶ ποταμῶν κατὰ στοιχεῖον ἐπίτομος ἀναγραφή)

Erasmus attributed the origins of this Latin parable to Diogenianus — piscem natare doces (teach fish how to swim).

Diogenianus is the first person known to have referred to the parable of The Dog in the Manger.

Notes

References

External links
Corpus paroemiographorum graecorum, E. L. Leutsch, F. G. Schneidewin (ed.), vol. 1, Gottingae, apud Vandenohoeck et Ruprecht, 1839, pp. 177–320 .
A Dictionary of Greek and Roman biography and mythology, By various writers. Ed. by William Smith, 1867, Vol. I, pp. 1024 
Suda On Line entries on search term “Diogenianus” 
Leopold Cohn: Diogenianos (4). In: Paulys Realencyclopädie der classischen Altertumswissenschaft (RE). Band V,1, Stuttgart 1903, Sp. 778–783. 
 Paroemiographi graeci, quorum pars nunc ex codicibus manuscriptis vulgatur. by Gaisford, Thomas. 1836. Oxonii E Typographeo Academico
 Paroemiographi graeci: Zenobius. Diogenianus. Plutarchus. Gregorius Cyprius. Ernst von Leutsch, Friedrich Wilhelm Schneidewin - 1839
 Paroemiographi graeci: Diogenianus, Gregorius Cyprius, Macarius, Aesopus, Apostolius et Arsenius, Mantissa proverborium. Ernst Ludwig von Leutsch, Friedrich Wilhelm Schneidewin. 1851.

Ancient Greek grammarians
2nd-century Greek people
2nd-century writers
People from Heraclea Pontica
Year of birth unknown
Year of death unknown